The 1997–98 Kategoria e Dytë was the 51st season of a second-tier association football league in Albania.

Group A

Group B

Group C

Group D

Championship/promotion playoff

Semi-finals

Final 

 Burreli was promoted to 1998–99 National Championship.

References

 Giovanni Armillotta

Kategoria e Parë seasons
2
Alba